Fernando G. Taylor House, also known as the Taylor-Kaiser-Smith House, is a historic home located at Versailles, Ripley County, Indiana.  It was built about 1860, and is a two-story, rectangular, five bay, vernacular frame dwelling with Gothic Revival style influences. It measures 44 feet wide and 36 feet deep.  The house rests on a poured concrete foundation and has a hipped roof.  It was moved to its present location in 1983.

It was added to the National Register of Historic Places in 1986.

References

Houses on the National Register of Historic Places in Indiana
Gothic Revival architecture in Indiana
Houses completed in 1860
Buildings and structures in Ripley County, Indiana
National Register of Historic Places in Ripley County, Indiana